The 2012 NCAA Division I softball season, play of college softball in the United States organized by the National Collegiate Athletic Association (NCAA) at the Division I level, began in February 2012.  The season progressed through the regular season, many conference tournaments and championship series, and concluded with the 2012 NCAA Division I softball tournament and 2012 Women's College World Series.  The Women's College World Series, consisting of the eight remaining teams in the NCAA Tournament and held in Oklahoma City at ASA Hall of Fame Stadium, ended on June 6, 2012.

Conference standings

Women's College World Series
The 2010 NCAA Women's College World Series took place from May 31 to June 6, 2012 in Oklahoma City.

Season leaders
Batting
Batting average: .492 – Samantha Fischer, Loyola Marymount Lions
RBIs: 94 – Christi Orgeron, Louisiana Ragin' Cajuns
Home run:s 32 – Camilla Carrera, UTEP Miners

Pitching
WINS: 42-3 – Jaclyn Traina, Alabama Crimson Tide
ERA: 0.95 (38 ER/280.2 IP) – Olivia Galati, Hofstra Pride
Strikeouts: 541 – Sara Plourde, UMass Minutewomen

Records
Junior class single game RBIs:
11 – Dacia Hale, Louisiana Tech Lady Techsters; May 10, 2012

Sophomore class saves:
12 – Chelsea Leonard, Louisville Cardinals

Senior class season of perfect stolen bases:
45-45 – Sammy Marshall, Western Illinois Leathernecks

Awards
USA Softball Collegiate Player of the Year:
Keilani Ricketts, Oklahoma Sooners

Honda Sports Award Softball:
Keilani Ricketts, Oklahoma Sooners

All America Teams
The following players were members of the All-American Teams.

First Team

Second Team

Third Team

References

External links